David Engelbert Miller (December 15, 1924 – October 8, 1996) was a Canadian ice hockey player. He was a member of the Edmonton Mercurys that won a gold medal at the 1952 Winter Olympics in Oslo, Norway.

References

External links
David Miller's profile at databaseOlympics
David Miller's profile at Sports Reference.com

1924 births
1996 deaths
Ice hockey players at the 1952 Winter Olympics
Olympic gold medalists for Canada
Olympic ice hockey players of Canada
Olympic medalists in ice hockey
Medalists at the 1952 Winter Olympics
Ice hockey people from Saskatchewan
Canadian ice hockey left wingers
People from Rural Municipality Buffalo No. 409, Saskatchewan